Cursed Mountain (Spanish: Sierra maldita) is a 1954 Spanish drama film directed by Antonio del Amo and starring Rubén Rojo, Lina Rosales and José Guardiola.

Cast
 Rubén Rojo as Juan  
 Lina Rosales as Cruz  
 José Guardiola as Lucas  
 José Sepúlveda 
 Manuel Zarzo as Emilio  
 Miguel Gómez 
 José Latorre 
 Vicente Ávila 
 Mario Moreno 
 Agustín Rivero 
 Tomás Torres
 Rodolfo del Campo 
 Blanca Suarez 
 Julia Pachelo 
 María Dolores Albert 
 Sirio Rosado 
 Luis Moreno 
 Francisco Beiro
 Mariquita Najar

References

Bibliography 
 Bentley, Bernard. A Companion to Spanish Cinema. Boydell & Brewer 2008.

External links 
 

1954 drama films
Spanish drama films
1954 films
1950s Spanish-language films
Films directed by Antonio del Amo
Films shot in Almería
Spanish black-and-white films
1950s Spanish films